Fowlerstown is an unincorporated community in Brooke County, West Virginia, United States. It lies on West Virginia Route 27, east of Wellsburg. It was also known as Fowlerston.

The Inn at Fowlerstown is listed on the National Register of Historic Places.

References

Unincorporated communities in Brooke County, West Virginia
Unincorporated communities in West Virginia